The Turkish Wheelchair Basketball Super League (TTSB Süper Ligi) is the top-flight professional league for wheelchair basketball teams in Turkey with men and women players. Established in 1997, it is  governed by the Turkey Disabled Sports Federation.

Ten teams compete annually in the league. The last placed two teams are relegated to a lower league, the Turkish Wheelchair Basketball First League (TTSB 1. Ligi) while the two top ranked teams of the lower league are promoted to the Super League. Galatasaray Wheelchair is with seven consecutive times the most successful team.

Winners

Performance by team

Teams by season
2022–23 season

See also
Wheelchair basketball
IWBF Champions Cup
André Vergauwen Cup
Willi Brinkmann Cup
IWBF Challenge Cup
Kitakyushu Champions Cup

References

League
Wheelchair
1997 establishments in Turkey
Wheelchair basketball leagues in Europe
Sports leagues established in 1997